Halothamnus glaucus is a species of the plant genus Halothamnus, that belongs to the subfamily Salsoloideae of the family Amaranthaceae, (formerly Chenopodiaceae). It occurs in Western and Central Asia.

Morphology 
Halothamnus glaucus is a sub-shrub up to 1 m high, with blueish-green pale-striped branches. The leaves are half-terete, fleshy, linear and up to 50 mm long and 0,7-2,0 mm wide. The bracts and bracteoles of the lower flowers are resembling the leaves, the bracts having basally wide membraneous margins. The flowers are 3,5-5,0 mm long with lanceolate-oval tepals, the stigmas are rounded at their tip. The winged fruit is 11–17 mm in diameter, their wings inserting in or something below the middle. The tube of the fruit is broadly cylindric, often dilated to its base, its bottom with circular-oval pits.

The species comprises three subspecies: subsp. glaucus, glabrous, and the stamen filaments 0,6-0,9 mm wide; subsp. hispidulus, densely hairy, and the stamen filaments only 0,5-0,7 mm wide; and subsp. tianschanicus with truncate stigmas.

Taxonomy 

The species has been first described in 1798 by Friedrich August Marschall von Bieberstein as Salsola glauca (In: Tableau des provinces situées sur la côte occidentale de la Mer Caspienne, St. Pétersbourg, 1798, p. 112). In 1981, Victor Petrovič Botschantzev included it into the genus Halothamnus (In: Bot. Mater. Gerb. Bot. Inst. Komarova Akad. Nauk SSSR 18: p. 157). Within the genus, it belongs to section Halothamnus.

Halothamnus glaucus is classified into three subspecies:
Halothamnus glaucus subsp. glaucus
Synonyms:
Salsola glauca M.Bieb.
Caroxylon glaucum (M.Bieb.) Moq.
Aellenia glauca (M.Bieb.) Aellen
Aellenia glauca (M.Bieb.) Aellen subsp. eu-glauca Aellen, nom.inval
Aellenia glauca (M.Bieb.) Aellen subsp. glauca
Aellenia glauca (M.Bieb.) Aellen subsp. eu-glauca Aellen f. reducta Aellen
Salsola spicata Pall. (non Willd. 1798), nom.illeg
Halothamnus heptapotamicus Botsch.

Halothamnus glaucus subsp. hispidulus (Bunge) Kothe-Heinr.
Synonyms: 
Caroxylon hispidulum Bunge 
Salsola hispidula (Bunge) Boiss
Salsola hispidula (Bunge) Bunge, nom.inval
Aellenia glauca (M.Bieb.) Aellen ssp. hispidula (Bunge) Aellen
Aellenia hispidula (Bunge) Botsch.
Aellenia hispidula (Bunge) Aellen, nom. Inval
Halothamnus hispidulus (Bunge) Botsch.

Halothamnus glaucus subsp. tianschanicus (Botsch.) Kothe-Heinr. 
Synonyms:
Halothamnus tianschanicus Botsch.

Distribution 
The distribution of  Halothamnus glaucus extends from eastern Turkey over Georgia, Armenia, Azerbaijan, Turkmenistan, northern Iran, Kazakhstan, Uzbekistan, Kyrgyzstan to China (Dzungaria, possibly Kashgaria) and Mongolia, too.
It grows in dry semideserts or mountain steppes on stony or clayey ground, partly on salty soils, up to 2000 m above sea-level.

Cultivation and uses 
Halothamnus glaucus is an important fodder plant for camels, sheep and goats and is locally cultivated. In former centuries, potash was extracted from the ash of the plants. The roots and above ground parts of the plants are containing alkaloids.

Vernacular names 
Azerbaijan: "Lekeli Š."
Iran, Khorasan: "Baebae", "Baebae-shour"
Turkmenistan: "Čoganok", "Čogon" 
China: 新疆藜  xin jiang li

References

External links 
 
 
 
 
 Halothamnus glaucus at Tropicos
 Photos of Halothamnus glaucus at plantarium.ru

glaucus
Taxa named by Victor Botchantsev